Aimons-nous vivants may refer to:

Aimons-nous vivants, 1989 album by François Valéry. See Discography section
"Aimons-nous vivants", 1989 single by François Valéry from his same-titled album. See Discography section
Aimons-nous vivants, 2021 album by Sadek. See Discography section